The Men's team pursuit competition at the 2020 World Single Distances Speed Skating Championships was held on February 15, 2020.

Results
The race was started at 15:18.

References

Men's team pursuit